This is a list of displayed Bell AH-1 Cobra helicopters.

Aircraft on display

Australia

AH-1G
 69-15092 – National Vietnam Veterans Museum, Phillip Island, Victoria.
AH-1S
 76-22592 – Historical Aircraft Restoration Society in Albion Park Rail, New South Wales.
 76-22598 – Historical Aircraft Restoration Society in Albion Park Rail, New South Wales.

Israel
AH-1F
 69-16411 - Holtz Technical High School, Tel Aviv 
 68-15021 - Israeli Air Force Museum  at Hatzerim Airbase in the Negev desert. Construction Number 20555. 
AH-1G
 68-15176 - Israeli Air Force Museum  at Hatzerim Airbase in the Negev desert. Construction Number 20710.

Japan

AH-1S
 73401 – Japanese Ground Self Defense Force (JGSDF) Public Information Center in Camp Asaka, Saitama Prefecture, Japan.

Pakistan
AH-1F
 Pakistan Army Museum Lahore in Lahore Cantonment
 Unknown - Pakistan Army Aviation Corps Khalid Airbase in Quetta Cantonment.

Spain
AH-1G
 72-21464 – San Carlos base at San Fernando

United Kingdom
AH-1G
 70-15990 – Museum of Army Flying in Middle Wallop, England.

United States
Airworthy
AH-1F
 66-15283 - Army Aviation Heritage Foundation and Flying Museum in Hampton, Georgia.
 67-15589 - Army Aviation Heritage Foundation and Flying Museum in Hampton, Georgia. 
 67-15766 - Army Aviation Heritage Foundation and Flying Museum in Hampton, Georgia. 
 67-15826 - Army Aviation Heritage Foundation and Flying Museum in Hampton, Georgia. 
 71-20998 - Army Aviation Heritage Foundation and Flying Museum in Hampton, Georgia. 
 79-23233 - Army Aviation Heritage Foundation and Flying Museum in Hampton, Georgia.
 83-24197 - Army Aviation Heritage Foundation and Flying Museum in Hampton, Georgia.
TAH-1P
 76-22599 - Lone Star Flight Museum, Galveston, Texas.
 76-22601 - privately owned in Acton, California.
 76-22695 - privately owned in Wilmington, Delaware.
 76-22707 - privately owned in Olympia, Washington.
 77-22758 - privately owned in Las Vegas, Nevada.
AH-1S
 80-23517 - Celebrade Freedom Foundation in Columbia, South Carolina.
Display
AH-1E (ECAS) Enhanced Cobra Armament System
 78-23063 – Veterans of Foreign Wars Post #5327 in Wentzville, Missouri.
AH-1F
 66-15309 – Veterans Administration Medical Center, Walsenburg, Colorado.
 66-15316 – Jackson County Veterans Memorial Park in Black River Falls, Wisconsin.
 66-15343 – Noevel Barnett Veterans of Foreign Wars Post #1341, Bull Shoals, Arkansas.
 66-15348 – Veterans of Foreign Wars Post #813 Du Bois, Pennsylvania.
 67-15457 – National Guard Armory at Warrensburg, Missouri.
 67-15474 – Alfonso Mazzini Memorial Park in Mark, Illinois.
 67-15475 – Veterans Memorial Park in Dixon, Illinois.
 67-15480 – Motts Military Museum in Groveport, Ohio.
 67-15491 – Veterans of Foreign Wars Post #1621 in Janesville, Wisconsin.
 67-15535 - Camp Perry, Ohio.
 67-15479 - Veterans of Foreign Wars Post #6491 in Burlington, Colorado.
 67-15508 -  Steven F. Udvar-Hazy Center in Chantilly, Virginia
 67-15599 – Leo Boston Vietnam Memorial Park at Fremont County Airport in Canon City, Colorado.
 67-15633 – Naval Air Station Wildwood Aviation Museum in Rio Grande, New Jersey.
 67-15650 – Veterans Memorial Park in Wahpeton, North Dakota.
 67-15659 – Veterans of Foreign Wars Post #6550 in Strum, Wisconsin.
 67-15690 – Niagara Aerospace Museum in Niagara Falls, New York. 
 67-15720 – Hoosier Air Museum in Auburn, Indiana.
 67-15722 – Hillsborough County Veterans Memorial Park, Tampa, Florida.
 67-15736 – Veterans Memorial Park in Island Lake, Illinois.
 67-15759 – Aviation Museum of Kentucky in Lexington, Kentucky.
 67-15813 – Veterans of Foreign Wars Post #11038 in Waterford, Wisconsin.
 67-15824 – Bangor, Wisconsin.
 67-15831 – Memorial Park, Alma, Georgia.
 68-15001 – Veterans Park in Kremmling, Colorado.
 68-15106 – Fireman's Park in North Lake, Wisconsin.
 68-15110 – New Hartford American Legion Post #1376 in New Hartford, New York.
 68-15116 – Matchaponix, New Jersey.
 68-15131 – Smyrna Airport in Smyrna, Tennessee.
 68-15133 – American Legion Post #237 in Footville, Wisconsin.
 68-15138 – American Helicopter Museum & Education Center in West Chester, Pennsylvania.
 68-15142 – Don F. Pratt Museum in Fort Campbell, Kentucky.
 68-15152 – Veterans of Foreign Wars Post #8280 in Mosinee, Wisconsin.
 68-17085 – Veterans of Foreign Wars Post #5156 in Sweetwater, Tennessee.
 69-16416 – March Field Air Museum in Riverside, California.
 69-16434 – Evergreen Aviation & Space Museum in McMinnville, Oregon.
 70-15967 - American Legion Post #34 in Gordon, Nebraska.
 70-15969 – Muir AAF, Harrisburg, Pennsylvania.
 70-15993 – Russell Military Museum in Zion, Illinois.
 70-16034 - American Legion Post #48 in Chesnee, South Carolina.
 70-16045 – Washington Park in Washington, Illinois.
 70-16091 – Aviation Army Command, Redstone Arsenal, Huntsville, Alabama.
 70-17028 - Yuma Proving Grounds, Arizona.
 70-19936 - Joint Base Lewis–McChord, Washington.
 71-21028—Veterans of Foreign Wars Post #4250 in New Smyrna Beach, Florida.
 71-21044 – Harold A. Fritz Veterans Park by American Legion Post #24 in Lake Geneva, Wisconsin.
 79-23209 - Pennsylvania NG, Johnstown, Pennsylvania.
 83-24193 – Hamilton Veterans Park in Hamilton, New Jersey.

AH-1G
 66-15249 - American Legion Post #255 in Croswell, Michigan.
 66-15298 – Pearl Harbor Aviation Museum on Ford Island, Hawaii.
 67-15574 – Palm Springs Air Museum in Palm Springs, California.
 67-15642 – Veterans Memorial Park of Collegedale, Tennessee.
 67-15675 – Selfridge Military Air Museum in Harrison Township, Michigan.
 68-15022 – American Legion Post #54 in Marshfield, Wisconsin.
 70-16084 – MAPS Air Museum in North Canton, Ohio.
 70-16086 – Air and Military Museum of the Ozarks in Springfield, Missouri.
 70-16090 – Don F. Pratt Museum in Fort Campbell, Kentucky.
 71-21003 – Pound, Wisconsin.
 71-21038 – Mid-America Air Museum in Liberal, Kansas.
 71-21047 – Southern Museum of Flight in Birmingham, Alabama.
AH-1S
 67-15546 –  Arkansas Air & Military Museum in Fayetteville, Arkansas.
 67-15661 –  American Legion Post #100 in Sparta, Wisconsin.
 67-15685 –  New Jersey National Guard Museum, in Sea Girt, New Jersey.
 67-15687 –  Butts AAF, Colorado Springs, Colorado.
 68-15018 –  Veterans of Foreign Wars Post #1831 Ellington, Missouri.
 68-15054 –  Big Spring Vietnam Memorial, Big Spring, Texas
 68-15067 –  Butts AAF, Colorado Springs, Colorado.
 68-15123 –  Veterans of Foreign Wars Post #9392 in Lowell, Wisconsin.
 68-15146 –  CAF Airpower Museum in Midland, Texas.
 68-15151 –  American Legion Post #114 in Eagle River, Wisconsin.
 68-15153 –  Texas Military Forces Museum in Austin, Texas.
 68-15169 –  American Legion Post #339 in Almond, Wisconsin.
 68-15179 –  City of Hubbard, Texas.
 68-15200 –  National Military Heritage Museum in St. Joseph, Missouri.
 68-15204 –  Veterans of Foreign Wars Post #5077 in O'Fallon, Missouri.
 68-17026 –  American Legion Post #75 in Fond du Lac, Wisconsin.
 68-17099 –  American Legion Post #309 in Kendall, Wisconsin.
 69-16437 –  Aviation Hall of Fame and Museum of New Jersey in Teterboro, New Jersey.
 70-15036 –  Wheeler Army Airfield, Wahiawa, Hawaii.
 70-15155 –  Moffett Historical Museum, Moffett Federal Airfield, California.
 70-15805 - American Legion Hall in Charlotte, Michigan.
 70-15936 - Joint Base Lewis McChord, Washington.
 70-15940 –  U.S. Veterans Memorial Museum, Huntsville, Alabama.
 70-15944 –  Veterans of Foreign Wars Post #3944 in Overland, Missouri.
 70-15948 –  Wisconsin Veterans Tribute in Cadott, Wisconsin.
 70-15975 –  The Iron County Courthouse in Hurley, Wisconsin
 70-15976 –  Hap Arnold Boulevard, Tobyhanna Army Depot in Tobyhanna, Pennsylvania.
 70-15981 –  New England Air Museum in Windsor Locks, Connecticut.
 70-15985 –  Pima Air and Space Museum in Tucson, Arizona.
 70-15998 –  Veterans of Foreign Wars Post #7694 in Prairie du Sac, Wisconsin.
 70-16000 –  Wisconsin National Guard Memorial Library and Museum at Volk Field Air National Guard Base in Camp Douglas, Wisconsin.
 70-16044 –  American Legion Post #110 in New Lisbon, Wisconsin.
 70-16047 –  Veterans of Foreign Wars Post #8068 in Elderon, Wisconsin.
 70-16060 –  Museum of the Kansas National Guard, Forbes Field Airport, Topeka, Kansas.
 70-16061 –  Iowa Aviation Museum in Greenfield, Iowa.
 71-21002 –  Lansing Airport in Lansing, Illinois.
 71-21041 –  Cobb Memorial Park in Ida Grove, Iowa.
 72-22754 –  USS Lexington Museum on the Bay in Corpus Christi, Texas.
 77-22791 –  Olympic Flight Museum in Olympia, Washington.
Under Restoration
AH-1F
 66-15295 - to airworthiness by Army Aviation Heritage Foundation and Flying Museum in Hampton, Georgia.
 67-15481 - to airworthiness by Army Aviation Heritage Foundation and Flying Museum in Hampton, Georgia.
 67-15854 - to airworthiness by Army Aviation Heritage Foundation and Flying Museum in Hampton, Georgia.
 68-17082 - to airworthiness by Army Aviation Heritage Foundation and Flying Museum in Hampton, Georgia.
 68-17083 - Veterans Memorial Museum in Chehalis, Washington.
 70-15942 - to airworthiness by Army Aviation Heritage Foundation and Flying Museum in Hampton, Georgia.
 79-23195 - to airworthiness by Army Aviation Heritage Foundation and Flying Museum in Hampton, Georgia.

AH-1S
 66-15352 - to airworthiness by Celebrade Freedom Foundation in Columbia, South Carolina.
 67-15520 - to airworthiness by Celebrate Freedom Foundation in Columbia, South Carolina.
 76-22567 - to airworthiness by Celebrate Freedom Foundation in Columbia, South Carolina.
 79-23211 - to airworthiness by Celebrate Freedom Foundation in Columbia, South Carolina.

References

External links
 Aerial Visuals: Family: Bell 209 / AH-1 Cobra
 CoastComp.com: Preserved US Military Aircraft - Hueys and Cobras
 Warbirds and Airshows: Display Helicopter Locations
 War Memorials of Wisconsin: Bell AH-1 Cobra

Lists of surviving military aircraft